Boletus variipes is a species of mycorrhizal bolete fungus in the family Boletaceae, native to North America. It was originally described by American mycologist Charles Horton Peck in 1888.

A 2010 paper analyzing the genetic relationships within Boletus found that what was classified at the time as B. variipes was not monophyletic. Populations from east of the Rocky Mountains were sister to B. hiratsukae of Japan, with those from Central America and southeastern North America were sister to that combined lineage. This required the latter group to be renamed. A third population—from the Philippines—that has been known as B. variipes was more distantly related.

Description 
Boletus variipes is closely related to Boletus edulis, and is a dry, velvety to patchy tan or brown-gray mushroom with frequently prominent white to off-white reticulation on its darker brown stipe.  It is often found under oaks (Quercus) and in mixed deciduous forests of aspen, maple and beech in eastern North America.

Taxonomy 
First described by C. H. Peck in 1888, with Boletus variipes var. fagicola described by Smith and Thiers in 1971.

Identification 
Boletus variipes has a broad, convex to almost flat cap between 6 and 20 cm, with a tendency to become cracked or finely patched in maturity, the flesh is white underside pore surface is white with pores which appear full when young, yellowing to olive as spores mature with a density of 1 to 2 pores per mm.  The stipe is between 8 and 15 cm long and from 1 to 3.5 cm thick with slightly narrower ends or a widening base.  The flesh of the cap and stipe does not discolor when cut or bruised.  Spore prints are olive/brown.

Distribution 
It is common throughout eastern North America and has been documented in Costa Rica.

Edibility 
While its odor and taste are mild, the species is a choice edible mushroom.

See also
List of Boletus species
List of North American boletes

References

External links

variipes
Edible fungi
Fungi described in 1888
Fungi of the United States
Taxa named by Charles Horton Peck
Fungi without expected TNC conservation status